Philip Edward Ruppe (born September 29, 1926) is an American former politician from the U.S. state of Michigan and a member of the Republican Party. He served in the U.S. House of Representatives from 1967 to 1979 before running, unsuccessfully for the United States Senate in 1982. He is a Korean War veteran, having served as a lieutenant in the U.S. Navy. After leaving the U.S. House, Ruppe became active in business before running for election, without success, to the 103rd Congress.

Biography

Ruppe was born in Laurium, Michigan, and graduated from high school in 1944. He attended the V-12 Navy College Training Program at Central Michigan University and University of Michigan, 1944–1946 and graduated from Yale University in 1948. He served in United States Navy during the Korean War as a lieutenant. He then served as director of Houghton National Bank, Commercial National Bank of L’Anse and R.L. Polk and Co.

Political activity

In 1966, Ruppe was the Republican candidate for the U.S. House of Representatives from Michigan's 11th congressional district. He defeated incumbent Democrat Raymond F. Clevenger, one of the "Five Fluke Freshmen", to be elected to the 90th Congress and was subsequently re-elected to the next five Congresses, serving from January 3, 1967, to January 3, 1979. He was not a candidate for reelection in 1978 to the 96th Congress.  Republican Robert William Davis from St. Ignace won election succeeding him in the district.

Post-political career and personal life

After leaving Congress, Ruppe was an unsuccessful candidate for the United States Senate in 1982 against Donald W. Riegle, Jr.  He served as president of Woodlak Company to 1986.

After a decade out of politics, Ruppe sought to retake his old district, now renumbered as the 1st District. He lost to former state representative Bart Stupak.

His wife, Loret Miller Ruppe, was a Presidential Elector for Michigan in 1980, Director of the Peace Corps from 1981 to 1989, and U.S. Ambassador to Norway from 1989 to 1993. She died in 1996; they had five children.

Philip Ruppe is a member of the American Legion, Veterans of Foreign Wars, and Rotary International and currently resides in Bethesda, Maryland.

References

 The Political Graveyard

1926 births
American people of Slovak descent
American people of Slovenian descent
Central Michigan University alumni
Living people
Military personnel from Michigan
People from Laurium, Michigan
Republican Party members of the United States House of Representatives from Michigan
University of Michigan alumni
Yale University alumni
United States Navy personnel of World War II
United States Navy personnel of the Korean War
United States Navy officers